Joe Morris may refer to:

Music
 Joe Morris (trumpeter) (1922–1958), American jazz trumpeter
 Joe Morris, a stage name of Chris Columbus (1902–2002), American jazz drummer
 Joe Morris (guitarist) (born 1955), American jazz guitarist
 Joe Morris (drummer) (born 1960), American studio drummer
 Joe Morris (songwriter) (born 1966), Botswanan songwriter and musician

Other
 Joe Morris (trade unionist) (1913–1996), Canadian trade unionist
 Joe Morris Sr. (1926–2011), Navajo code talker
 Joe Morris (American football) (born 1960), American former NFL running back
 Joe Hall Morris (1922–2003), oral surgeon and educator
 Joe Morris (rugby union) (born 1998), English rugby union player
 Joe Morris, suspected bomber of the Dar Al-Farooq Islamic Center in Bloomington, Minnesota
 Joe Morris, American businessman whose business ventures with Bernard Garrett were dramatized in the 2020 film The Banker

See also
Joseph Morris (disambiguation)